This is a list of abbreviations used in a business of financial context.

0-9
1H – First half of the year
24/7 – 24 hours a day, seven days a week
80/20 – According to the Pareto principle, for many events, roughly 80% of the effects come from 20% of the causes

A
ADR – Alternative dispute resolution 
AI – Artificial Intelligence
AM – Account manager
AOP – Adjusted Operating Profit
AOP – Annual Operating Plan
AP – Accounts payable
AR – Accounts receivable
ARPU – Average revenue per user
ASP – Average selling price
agcy. – Agency
agt. – Agent
asst. – Assistant
a/c. – Account

B
BAU – Business As Usual
BEP – Break Even Point
BIC – Bank Identifier Code
bldg. – Building
BLS – Balance sheet
BMC – Business Model Canvas
BOM – Bill of materials
BPO – Business Process Outsourcing
BPR – Brief Project Report
BPV – Bank Payment Voucher
BRD – Business Requirements Document
BRU – Business Recovery Unit
BRV – Bank Receipt Voucher
BTW – By the way
B2B – Business-to-business
B2C – Business to Consumer
B2G – Business-to-government
BU – Business Unit
BUSI – Business
bus. – Business
BFRS – Bangladesh Financial Reporting Standards

C
CAGR – Compound annual growth rate
CAO – Chief Administrative Officer or Chief Accounting Officer
CAPEX – Capital Expenditure
CAPM – Capital asset pricing model
CBOE – Chicago Board Options Exchange
CBOT – Chicago Board of Trade
CDO – Collateralized debt obligation or Chief Data Officer
CDM – Change and Data Management
CDS – Credit default swap
CEO – Chief executive officer
COA – Chart of Account
CFA – Chartered Financial Analyst
CFD – Contract for difference
CFC – Consumption of fixed capital
CFCT – Cash Flow Cycle Time
CFM – Certified Financial Manager
CFO  – Chief Financial Officer
CFS – Consolidated Financial Statement
CIA – Certified Internal Auditor
CIF – Cost Insurance With Freight
CIMA  – Chartered Institute of Management Accountants
CIO – Chief Information Officer, Chief Innovation Officer or Chief Investment Officer
CIP – Carriage and Insurance Paid
CISA – Certified Information Systems Auditor
CISO – Chief Information Security Officer
CLO – Chief Legal Officer
CMA – Certified Management Accountant
CMFB – Committee on monetary, finance and balance of payments statistics
CMO – Chief Marketing Officer
COB – Close of Business
COC – Cost of Credit or Cost of Capital
COD – Cost of Debt or Cash on Delivery
COE – Center of Excellence or Cost of Equity
COGS – Cost of Goods Sold
Corp. – Corporation
COO – Chief Operating Officer
CPA – Certified Public Accountant
CPI – Consumer Price Index
CPO – Chief People Officer also Chief Procurement Officer
CPQ – Configure, Price, Quote
CPU – Central Processing Unit
CSI – Corporate Social Investment
CSO – Chief Security Officer
CSR – Corporate social responsibility
CRM – Customer Relationship Management
CVP – Cost Volume Profit
CTA – Call to action
CTO – Chief Technology Officer
CX – Customer Experience
CXO – Any chief officer(s), x being a placeholder.
C2B – Consumer-to-business
C&F – Cost With Freight
 CKM –  Customer Knowledge Management
 CTC – Cost to company
 CUSIP number – Committee on Uniform Security Identification Procedures number
 Cr – Credit
 CA – Current account (disambiguation)Current Account

D
DDA – Depletion Depreciation amortization
Dept. – Department
DI –  Dispatch information
DIFOT – Delivery in full on time, a variant of On Time In Full
Dir – Director
disc. – Discount
DMA – Direct market access
DOE – Depending on Experience
DPO – Days Payable Outstanding
DR – Depositary receipt
DSO – Days Sales Outstanding
DSP – Delivery service provider
DTP– Desktop Publishing
DVP – Delivery versus payment

E
EAR – Effective annual rate
EAY – Effective Annual Yield
EBITA – Earnings before interest and taxes and amortization
EBITDA – Earnings before Interest, Taxes, Depreciation, and Amortization
 ECB – European Central Bank
ECS – Electronic Clearing Service or Electronic Clearing System
EDI – Electronic Data Interchange
EFSM – European Financial Stabilisation Mechanism
EFTPOS – Electronic Funds Transfer at Point of Sale
EIDL – Economic Injury Disaster Loan 
EPS – Earnings per share
EXP – Export
EOB – End of business
EOD – End of day
EOM – End of Message
ERP – Enterprise Resource Planning
ETA – Estimated Time of Arrival
ETD – Estimated Time of Departure or Estimated Time of Delivery
EMI – Equated Monthly Installment
EPC – Export Promotion Council
ECGC – Export Credit Guarantee Corporation of India
EXW – Ex Works

F
FAB – Feature Advantage Benefits
FDP – Finance Department
FOB – Freight On Board
FIFO – First In, First Out
FinMin – Finance Minister
Fin Min – Finance Minister
FL – Financial leverage
FOMC – Federal Open Market Committee
FP&A – Financial Planning & Analysis
FPO – Follow-on Public Offer
FIX – Financial Information Exchange
FSA – Financial Services Authority
FTE – Full-Time Equivalent
FV – Future Value
FX – Foreign exchange market
FY – Fiscal year or Financial year
FYA – For Your Action
FYI – For Your Information
FOC – Free Of Cost
F/U – Follow-Up
FYF – Full Year Forecast

G
GAAP – Generally Accepted Accounting Principles
GAAS – Generally Accepted Audit Standards
GDP –  Gross Domestic Product
GDPR – General Data Protection Regulation
GDR – Global depository receipt
GFCF – Gross fixed capital formation
GL – General Ledger
GMV – Gross Merchandise Volume
GP – Gross Profit
GPO – Group purchasing organization
GRN – Goods Receipt Note
GRNI – Goods Receipt Not Invoiced
GSV – Gross Sales Value
GVC – Global value chain
GMROII – Gross Margin Return on Inventory Investment
G&A – General and Administration expense. expenditures related to the day-to-day operations of a business.

H
HMRC – Her Majesty's Revenue and Customs
HP – Hire purchase
HQ – Headquarters
HR – Human Resources
HRD – Human Resource Development
HS Code – Harmonized Commodity Description and Coding System

I
IAS – International Accounting Standards
IBAN – International Bank Account Number
ICB – Industry Classification Benchmark
ICRM – Innovative Customer Relationship Management
IE – Interest expense
IFRS – International Financial Reporting Standard
ILCLP – IdentLogic Systems Customer Loyalty Program
IMF – International Monetary Fund
IMP – Import
Inc. – Incorporated
IoT – Internet of Things
IPO – Initial public offering
IPT – Item Per Transaction
IR – Interest rate – typically referring to an IR derivative product
IRS – Internal Revenue Service
IRR – Internal Rate of Return
ISIN – International Securities Identification Number
ISM – Institute for Supply Management
ITT – Invitation to tender
IYR – In Year Revenue

J
J – Journal 
JIT – Just in time
JIS – Just in sequence
JST – Joint Supervisory Team
JV – Joint Venture

K
K – Is used as an abbreviation for 1,000. For example, $225K would be understood to mean $225,000, and $3.6K would be understood to mean $3,600. Multiple K's are not commonly used to represent larger numbers. In other words, it would look odd to use $1.2KK to represent $1,200,000.
Ke – Is used as an abbreviation for Cost of Equity (COE). Ke is the risk-adjusted, theoretical rate of return on a Company's invested excess capital obtained through external investments.  Among other things, the value of Ke and the Cost of Debt (COD) enables management to arbitrate different forms of short and long term financing for various types of expenditures.  Ke applies most prominently to companies that regularly generate excess capital (free cash flow, cash on hand) from ongoing operations.  Critically, in assessing a company's financial position (and reading its balance sheet), COE is distinguished from CAPEX, or costs associated with Capital Expenditures.  Ke is most often used in the Capital Asset Pricing Model (CAPM), in which Ke = Rf + ß(Rm-Rf).   In this equation, Ke (COE) equals the anticipated return from the difference (Beta) of investment yields from a return based on market expectations (Rm) and a Risk Free Rate (Rf), such as Treasury Bills or Bonds.  
KIBOR – Karachi Interbank Offered Rate
KPI – Key Performance Indicator, a type of performance measurement. An organization may use KPIs to evaluate its success, or to evaluate the success of a particular activity in which it is engaged.
KYC – "Know Your Customer" refers to due diligence activities that financial institutions and other regulated companies must perform to ascertain relevant information.

L
LBO – Leveraged Buyout
LC – Letter of credit
LIBOR – London Interbank Offered Rate
LE – Latest Estimate
LIFFE – London International Financial Futures and Options Exchange
LIFO – Last In, First Out
LLC – Limited Liability Company
 LME – London Metal Exchange
 LMS – Learning Management System
Ltd. – Limited Company
LTV – Loan to Value
LOC – Lines of Credit
LOI – Letter of intent
LoU – Letters of Undertaking
LY – Last Year

M
 MBS – Mortgage-backed security
mfg. – Manufacturing
MGMT – Management
 MIC – Market Identifier Code
 MiFID – Markets in Financial Instruments Directive
MILE – Maximum impact, little effort 
MoM  – Month on Month / Month over Month
MOQ – Minimum Order Quantity
MOU – Memorandum of understanding
MPC – marginal propensity to consume
MRO – Maintenance, Repair, and Operations
MRP  – Maximum Retail Price
MSOD – Monthly Statement of Select Operational Data
MSRP – Manufacturer's Suggested Retail Price
MTD – Month-to-date
MWC – Managerial Working Capital
MPR – Monthly Progress Report
MTM – Mark To Market

N
 NAV – Net asset value
 NCBO – No Change of Beneficial Ownership
 NCND – Non-Circumvent and Non-Disclosure
 NDA – Non-Disclosure Agreement
 NII – Net Interest Income
 NIM – Net Interest Margin
NNTO – No Need To Open
 NOA – Net Operating Assets
 NOI – Net Operating Income
 NOPAT – Net Operating Profit After Tax
 NPA – Non Performing Asset
 NPL – Non-performing loan
 NPV – Net Present Value
 NTE – Not To Exceed
 NYMEX – New York Mercantile Exchange
 NYSE – New York Stock Exchange
 NFO − New Fund Offer

O
OC – Opportunity Cost
OCF – Operating cash flow
OECD – Organisation for Economic Co-operation and Development
OEM – Original Equipment Manufacturer
OIBDA – Operating Income Before Depreciation And Amortization
OKR – Objectives and key results
OOF – Out of Facility, used interchangeably with Out of Office and originating from the Microsoft Xenix mail system 
OOO – Out of Office
OPEX – Operating Expenditure or Operational Expenditure
OTIF – On Time In Full
OTC – Over-the-counter (finance)

P
P&L – Profit and Loss
P2B – Platform to Business
PA  – Purchasing agent or Personal Assistant
PA  – Promotional Activity 
PAT – Profit After Tax
PBT – Profit Before Tax
P/E – Price-to-earnings ratio
PE – Private Equity
PEG – Price-to-earnings growth ratio
PHEK  – Planherstellungskosten (Product Planning cost)
PFI – Private Finance Initiative
PI or PII – Professional Indemnity (insurance coverage)
PII – Personally identifiable information
pip – Percentage in point or Periodic Investment Plan
PMAC – Period Moving Average Cost
PO – Profit Objective or Purchase Order
POA – Plan Of Action
POS – Point of sale
PP&E – Property, plant, and equipment
PPP – Public-private partnership
PPP – Purchasing power parity
PPT  – Powerpoint presentation
PR  – Purchase Requisition
PSP – Profit Sharing Plan
PTC – Private Trust Company
PTD  – Project to Date
PLR – Prime Lending Rate
PWIN – Percent win (a measure of performance of capture when bidding for contracts with a targeted customer base such as bidding for government contracts) 
PWP – Personal Wealth Portfolio

Q
Q1, Q2, Q3, Q4 – quarters of the accounting year, calendar year or fiscal year
QC – Quality control or Quality costs
QoQ – Quarter on quarter
QPR – Quarterly Performance Report
QRP – Qualified Retirement Plan
q/q – Quarter on quarter
QTD – Quarter-to-date

R
RAQSCI – Regulatory, Assurance of Supply, Quality, Service, Cost, Innovation (see RAQSCI)
RBI – Reserve Bank of India
RBA – Reserve Bank of Australia
RE – Retained Earnings
REIT – Real Estate Investment Trust
RFI – Request for information
RFP – Request for Proposal
RFQ – Request for Quotation
RFX – Generic name for a Request for Information, Proposal or Quotation
RMD – Required Minimum Distribution
R/O – Rollover
ROA – Return on assets
ROB – Return on brand
ROC – Registration Of Company
ROCE – Return on Capital Employed
ROE – Return on Equity
ROI – Return on Investment
ROIC – Return on Invested Capital
RONA – Return on net assets
ROS – Return on Sales
RR – Resource rent
RSP – Retail selling price
RWA – Risk-weighted asset
R&D – Research and Development
RC – Retail Company

S
St – Sales, during time period t.
S&M – Sales & Marketing
SLR – Statutory Liquidity Ratio
S&OP – Sales and operations planning
SAAS – Software-as-a-Service
SAM – Strategic Asset Management or Software Asset Management
SBU – Strategic Business Unit
SBLC – Stand By Letter of Credit
SCM – Supply Chain Management
SCBA – Social Cost Benefit Analysis
SEBI – Securities and Exchange Board of India
SEC – Securities and Exchange Commission
SEDOL – Stock Exchange Daily Official List 
SF – Structured Finance
SG&A – Sales, General, and Administrative expenses
SIMPLE – Savings Incentive Match Plan for Employees
SIOP – Sales Inventory and Operations Plan
SIR – Stores Issuance Requisition
SIV – Structured investment vehicle
SKU – Stock keeping unit
SLA – Service Level Agreement
SMA – Separately Managed Account
SME – Small and Medium Enterprises
SOHO – Small Office/Home Office
SOP – Standard Operating Procedure
SOW – Statement of Work
SOX – Sarbanes-Oxley
SPP – Systematic Payment Plan
SROI – Social return on investment
SSN – Social Security Number
Stg  – Sterling, the currency of the United Kingdom
STP – Situation Target Proposal or Situation Target Path 
SUA – Start Up Agreement
SWM – Strategic Wealth Management
SWIP – Systematic Withdrawal from Investment Plan
SWOT – Strengths, Weaknesses, Opportunities, Threats

T
TB – Transaction Banking
TBC – To Be Completed
TBD – To Be Defined
TCO – Total Cost of Ownership
TCV – Total Contract Value
TOTW – Time Off for Time Worked
TQM – Total Quality Management
TSR – Total shareholder return
TTM – Trailing Twelve Months
TVM – Time Value of Money 
Ts & Cs – Terms and Conditions

U
USP – Unique Selling Proposition
UPI – Unified Payment Interface

V
VAD – Value-Added Distributor
VaR – Value at Risk
VAR – Value-Added Reseller
VAT – Value-Added Tax
VC – Venture Capital
VP – Vice President

W
WACC – Weighted average cost of capital
WC – Working capital
WFH – Work From Home
wk – week
wrk – work
wo –  work order
WOGs –  With other Goods
WIGs – Wildly Important Goals
wasp – weighted average selling price
WLL – With Limited Liability
w.r.t – With Respect To
WTI – West Texas Intermediate
WVN – Withdraw Voucher Note
WHT – Withholding Tax
WTO – World Trade Organization
WTD – Week-To-Date
WW – World Wide

X

Y
YTD – Year-to-date
YTG – Year-to-go
YOY – Year-over-year
YTC – Yet-To-Confirm

Z
ZBB – Zero Based Budgeting
zcyc – Zero Coupon Yield Curve
ZOPA – Zone of Possible Agreement

References 

Lists of abbreviations
Abbreviations